Gardner Williams may refer to:
 Gardner Williams (swimmer), American freestyle swimmer
 Gardner D. Williams, American politician
 Gardner F. Williams, American mining engineer and author